"Stuck in the Middle/I Surrender" is the fifth single by English girl group Clea. The double A-side single was not released in the UK, and was only released in the rest of Europe. Both songs appear on their UK debut album, Trinity.

2006 Europe release
CD single
"Stuck in the Middle" 
"Stuck in the Middle" (Cutfather & Joe Mix feat. ODB) 
"I Surrender" 
"I Surrender" (Magic Mitch Radio)

Kate Ryan version

In 2008, Kate Ryan covered "I Surrender" on her studio album Free. A new version of the song was created with British producer Darren Tate for the single release. Produced by Niclas Kings and Niklas Bergwall (2N), and the single version was produced by Cédric Lorrain "RLS", Stephane Lozach and Olivier Visconti (SECO Productions). It has proved most successful in the Netherlands, where it peaked at No. 12.

During her UK tour in 2008, this song was mixed with the Chemical Brothers' "Galvanize".

Track listing
 CD single
"I Surrender" (PF Pumping Radio Edit) - 3:00
"I Surrender" (PF Pumping Extended Mix) - 6:40
"I Surrender" (Album Version) - 3:31
"I Surrender" (Jewelz Reset Remix) - 6:58

Official versions
Album Version - 03:31
Cansis Radio Edit - 3:57
Cansis Remix - 5:25
Jewelz Remix - 5:11
Jewelz Reset Remix - 6:58
PF Pumping Radio Edit - 03:00 (used as the Single Mix)
PF Pumping Extended Mix - 06:40

Weekly charts

Year-end charts

References

External links

2006 songs
2006 singles
2008 singles
Clea (group) songs
Kate Ryan songs
Songs written by Victoria Horn